The German School of Oslo (often abbreviated DSO) is a German-language school in Oslo, Norway and is led by Oliver Schaefer. It is located in Sporveisgata 20 at Bislett, and was opened in 1980. In the beginning, the school was located in the basement of the German Protestant Community of Oslo in Eilert Sundts gate 37, before it moved to Majorstuen School. In 1998, the DSO moved from Majorstuen to the disused Hegdehaugen Upper Secondary School, where it has been ever since.

The school is divided in 2 builds and comprises a kindergarten, a primary and upper secondary school. It is a private school, but it receives financial support from the Norwegian and German states. , there are 320 students and 82 kindergarten children at the school.

References

External links

 
 

1980 establishments in Norway
Oslo
Oslo
International schools in Norway
Schools in Oslo
Educational institutions established in 1980